Bird City may refer to:

 Bird City (wildfowl refuge)
 Bird City, Kansas
 Bird City Township, Cheyenne County, Kansas